Nicolae (or Niculae) is an Aromanian and Romanian masculine given name or surname, the equivalent of the English Nicholas. In Romanian, its feminine form is Nicoleta.

In politics
 Nicolae Alexandru of Wallachia, Prince of Wallachia between 1352 and November 1364
 Nicolae Bălcescu, Romanian Wallachian soldier, historian, journalist, and leader of the 1848 Wallachian Revolution
 Nicolae Ceaușescu, communist leader of the Socialist Republic of Romania from 1965 until his execution in 1989
 Nicolae Cernăuțeanu, Bessarabian politician, member of Sfatul Țării
 Nicolae Ciucă, Romanian army general, currently Prime Minister of Romania
 Nicolae Crețulescu, Romanian politician, served as Prime Minister
 Nicolae Cristea (communist)
 Nicolae Cristea (priest)
 Nicolae Enescu, Romanian politician
 Nicolae Golescu, Wallachian Romanian politician, served as Prime Minister
 Nicolae Iorga, historian, university professor, literary critic, memorialist, playwright, poet, and Romanian politician
 Nicolae Osmochescu, Moldovan academic and politician 
 Nicolae Păiș, Romanian navy officer, served as Minister of the Air Force and the Navy
 Nicolae Petrescu-Comnen, Romanian diplomat, politician
 Nicolae Rădescu, Romanian army officer, served as Prime Minister
 Nicolae Rosetti-Bălănescu, Romanian politician, served as Minister of Foreign Affairs
 Nicolae Samsonovici, Romanian army officer, served as Defense Minister
 Nicolae Titulescu, Romanian diplomat, government minister, and President of the League of Nations
 Nicolae Văcăroiu, Romanian politician, served as Prime Minister
 Nicolae Țâu, Moldovan politician who was Foreign Minister of Moldova between 1990 and 1993.

In science
 Nicolae Donici, Romanian astronomer born in Bessarabia
 Nicolae Hortolomei, Romanian surgeon and academic
 Nicolae Leon, Romanian biologist
 Nicolae Paulescu, Romanian physiologist, professor of medicine and the discoverer of insulin
 Nicolae Popescu, Romanian mathematician
 Nicolae Teclu, Romanian chemist, inventor of the "Teclu burner"
 Nicolae Vasilescu-Karpen, Romanian engineer and physicist, who did pioneering work in the field of telegraphy and telephony

In other fields
 Nicolae Alevra, Romanian general and politician
 Nicolae Butacu, Romanian swimmer
 Nicolae Cambrea, Romanian general
 Nicolae Carandino, Romanian author, pamphleteer, translator, and writer
 Nicolae Ciupercă, Romanian general
 Nicolae Costescu, Romanian general
 Nicolae Cotos, Romanian theologian
 Nicolae Dabija (general), Romanian general and politician
 Nicolae Dabija (soldier), Romanian officer and anticommunist resistance fighter
 Nicolae Dărăscu, Romanian painter
 Nicolae Densușianu, Romanian ethnologist
 Nicolae Dobrin, Romanian football (soccer) player
 Nicolae Drăganu, Romanian linguist
 Nicolae Filimon, Wallachian Romanian writer
 Nicolae Grigorescu, Romanian painter
 Nicolae Guță, Romanian manele singers
 Nicolae Ianovici, Aromanian linguist
 Nicolae Ivan, Romanian freestyle swimmer
 Nicolae Kovács, Romanian-Hungarian football player and coach
 Nicolae Labiș, Romanian poet
 Nicolae Malaxa, Romanian engineer and industrialist
 Nicolae Manolescu, Romanian literary critic
 Nicolae Mitea, Romanian football (soccer) forward
 Nicolae Petala, Romanian general
 Nicolae Saramandu, Romanian linguist and philologist
 Nicolae Tătăranu, Romanian general
 Nicolae Testemițanu, Moldovan physician and politician
 Nicolae Tonitza, Romanian painter
 Nicolae Vermont, Romanian painter

In fiction
 Nicolae Carpathia, fictional character in the Left Behind series of novels by Tim LaHaye and Jerry B. Jenkins

Other uses
 Nicolae Dobrin Stadium
 Nicolae Romanescu Park
 Nicolae Bălcescu, Călărași, a commune in Călărași County, Romania

As a surname
Petre Nicolae, Romanian actor

See also 

 Neculai (disambiguation)
 Nicholas (name)
Nicușor
Nicola (name)
Nicolai (given name)
Nicolaj
Nicolao
Nicolas (given name)
Nicolau
Nicolau (surname)
Nicolay

Aromanian masculine given names
Romanian masculine given names
Romanian-language surnames